The 1985–86 Hellenic Football League season was the 33rd in the history of the Hellenic Football League, a football competition in England.

Premier Division

The Premier Division featured 16 clubs which competed in the division last season, along with two new clubs, promoted from Division One:
Pegasus Juniors
Yate Town

League table

Division One

Division One featured 13 clubs which competed in the division last season, along with three new clubs:
Clanfield, relegated from the Premier Division
Didcot Town, relegated from the Premier Division
Penhill, joined from the Wiltshire League

League table

References

External links
 Hellenic Football League

1985-86
8